The following is a list of Australian television ratings for the year 2018.

Network shares

Most Watched Broadcasts in 2018

See also

Television ratings in Australia

References

2018
2018 in Australian television